Summer Love is an Australian ensemble comedy series on ABC TV, first airing on 31 August 2022. The eight-part anthology series was created and produced by Robyn Butler and Wayne Hope.

Premise

An anthology series which sees eight very different sets of people rent the same beachside holiday house through the theme of love.

Cast

Episode 1
 Patrick Brammall as Tom
 Harriet Dyer as Steph
 Stephen Curry as Jonah
 Sibylla Budd as Jules
 Evelyn Pell & Mila Pell as Molly
 Matt Dower as FM Radio DJ

Episode 2
 Miranda Tapsell as Kelly
 Richard Davies as Craig
 Lana Golga as Surf Shop Assistant 
 Nicolette Minster as Deedee
 David Quirk as Bryron
 Roxanne McDonald as Elsie
 Rachel Pepper as Mother from Surf Shop
 Lisa Mitrov as Waitress

Episode 3
 Nazeem Hussain as Imran
 Sana’a Shaik as Nabilah
 Shapoor Batliwalla as Jaaved
 Jane Harber as Caiti
 Sukhdeep Singh Bhogal (L-FRESH The LION) as Sukhdeep
 David Quirk as Byron

Episode 4
 Robyn Butler as Marion
 Wayne Hope as Eddy

Episode 5
 Tim Draxl as Luke
 Harry McNaughton as Olly
 Blake Richardson as Jett

Episode 6
 Chenoa Deemal as Charlie
 Bjorn Stewart as Zeke
 Jarron Andy as Ben
 Shakira Clanton as Finlay
 Charles Wu as Roger
 Jason Klarwein as Jason

Episode 7
 Alison Bell as Hannah
 Annie Maynard as Alex
 Claudia Greenstone as Mum
 Nick Russell as Dad
 Talia Hoskins Green as Young Hannah
 Gisele Field as Young Alex
 Harvey Devlin as Otto
 Noah Percy as Raphael
 Travis Cotton as Rob
 Alicia Banit as Ella

Episode 8
 Johnny Carr as Dan
 Charlotte Maggi as Frankie
 Morgana O'Reilly as Becky
 Keith Robinson as Poseidon Trevor
 Bev Killick as Bev

Production
Each of the eight episodes is written by a different writing team. The writing teams comprise: creators Robyn Butler and Wayne Hope, along with Kodie Bedford and Bjorn Stewart; Alison Bell; Patrick Brammall and Harriet Dyer; Nazeem Hussain; Kate Mulvany; Miranda Tapsell and James Colley; Jayden Masciulli and Nath Valvo.

Episodes

See also
 It's a Date

References

External links

Gristmill Productions
Kinetic Content

Australian Broadcasting Corporation original programming
Australian comedy television series
2022 Australian television series debuts
English-language television shows